Da Grande Amigos New Generation Sports Club, generally known as Da Grande Sports Club, is a Maldivian football club, that competes in the Dhivehi Premier League, the highest tier of Maldivian football.

Club history
The club won promotion to the First Division in 2018, after becoming the champions of 2018 Second Division Football Tournament. They also won the Third Division Football Tournament in 2015.

Domestic history

Notes

Players

Current squad

Management team

Honours

League
 Second Division 
Winners: 2018
 Third Division
Winners: 2015

Footnotes

External links
 
 
 

Football clubs in the Maldives
Football clubs in Malé
Association football clubs established in 2015
2015 establishments in the Maldives
Dhivehi Premier League clubs